Aruodynerus is an Australasian genus of potter wasps known from Aru and New Guinea.

References

Biological pest control wasps
Potter wasps